Satellite system may refer to:
Satellite system (astronomy), a collection of objects orbiting around a planetary mass object
Satellite constellation, a system of artificial satellites 
Satellite navigation system, a system of artificial satellites that provide autonomous geo-spatial positioning with global coverage
Satellite radio system, a space radio system using one or more artificial earth satellites